Alex Suhr (7 October 1898 – 29 May 1964) was a Danish film actor. He appeared in 32 films between 1923 and 1963. He was born in Copenhagen, Denmark and died in Denmark.

Selected filmography

  - 1923
  - 1927
  - 1929
  - 1929
  - 1929
  - 1930
  - 1932
  - 1932
  - 1932
  - 1933
  - 1934
Kidnapped - 1935
  - 1935
  - 1937
[[Incognito (1937 film)| - 1937
  - 1940
  - 1941
  - 1941
  - 1943
  - 1945
  - 1947
  - 1948
  - 1949
  - 1949
  - 1950
  - 1958
  - 1958
  - 1960
  - 1961
  - 1961
  - 1961
  - 1961
  - 1963
  - 1963

External links

1898 births
1964 deaths
Danish male film actors
Danish male silent film actors
20th-century Danish male actors
Male actors from Copenhagen